The 2015 UEFA Women's Under-17 Championship qualifying competition was a women's under-17 football competition played in 2014 and 2015 to determine the seven teams joining Iceland, who qualified automatically as hosts, in the 2015 UEFA Women's Under-17 Championship final tournament. A total of 43 UEFA member national teams entered the qualifying competition.

Each match lasted 80 minutes, consisting of two halves of 40 minutes, with an interval of 15 minutes.

Format
The qualifying competition consisted of two rounds:
Qualifying round: Apart from Germany, France and Spain, which receive byes to the elite round as the three teams with the highest seeding coefficient, the remaining 40 teams were drawn into 10 groups of four teams. Each group was played in single round-robin format at one of the teams selected as hosts after the draw. The 10 group winners, the 10 runners-up, and the third-placed team with the best record against the first and second-placed teams in their group advanced to the elite round.
Elite round: The 24 teams were drawn into six groups of four teams. Each group was played in single round-robin format at one of the teams selected as hosts after the draw. The six group winners and the runner-up with the best record against the first and third-placed teams in their group qualified for the final tournament.

Tiebreakers
If two or more teams were equal on points on completion of a mini-tournament, the following tie-breaking criteria were applied, in the order given, to determine the rankings:
 Higher number of points obtained in the mini-tournament matches played among the teams in question;
 Superior goal difference resulting from the mini-tournament matches played among the teams in question;
 Higher number of goals scored in the mini-tournament matches played among the teams in question;
 If, after having applied criteria 1 to 3, teams still had an equal ranking, criteria 1 to 3 were reapplied exclusively to the mini-tournament matches between the teams in question to determine their final rankings. If this procedure did not lead to a decision, criteria 5 to 9 applied;
 Superior goal difference in all mini-tournament matches;
 Higher number of goals scored in all mini-tournament matches;
 If only two teams had the same number of points, and they were tied according to criteria 1 to 6 after having met in the last round of the mini-tournament, their rankings were determined by a penalty shoot-out (not used if more than two teams had the same number of points, or if their rankings were not relevant for qualification for the next stage).
 Lower disciplinary points total based only on yellow and red cards received in the mini-tournament matches (red card = 3 points, yellow card = 1 point, expulsion for two yellow cards in one match = 3 points);
 Drawing of lots.

To determine the best third-placed team from the qualifying round and the best runner-up from the elite round, the results against the teams in fourth place were discarded. The following criteria were applied:
 Higher number of points;
 Superior goal difference;
 Higher number of goals scored;
 Lower disciplinary points total based only on yellow and red cards received (red card = 3 points, yellow card = 1 point, expulsion for two yellow cards in one match = 3 points);
 Drawing of lots.

Qualifying round

Draw
The draw for the qualifying round was held at UEFA headquarters in Nyon, Switzerland on 20 November 2013 at 09:00 CET (UTC+1).

The teams were seeded according to their coefficient ranking, calculated based on the following:
2011 UEFA Women's Under-17 Championship final tournament and qualifying competition (qualifying round and elite round)
2012 UEFA Women's Under-17 Championship final tournament and qualifying competition (qualifying round and elite round)
2013 UEFA Women's Under-17 Championship final tournament and qualifying competition (qualifying round and elite round)

Each group contained one team from Pot A, one team from Pot B, and two teams from Pot C.

Notes
Iceland (Coeff: 1.000) qualified automatically for the final tournament as hosts.
Albania, Andorra, Armenia, Cyprus, Georgia, Gibraltar, Liechtenstein, Luxembourg, Malta, and San Marino did not enter.

Groups
Times up to 25 October 2014 were CEST (UTC+2), thereafter times were CET (UTC+1).

Group 1

Group 2

Group 3

Group 4

Group 5

Group 6

Group 7

Group 8
Signe Bruun's eight goals against Kazakhstan equalled a competition record set by Vivianne Miedema against Kazakhstan as well in 2012.

Group 9

Group 10

Ranking of third-placed teams
To determine the best third-placed team from the qualifying round which advanced to the elite round, only the results of the third-placed teams against the first and second-placed teams in their group were taken into account.

Elite round

Draw
The draw for the elite round was held at UEFA headquarters in Nyon, Switzerland on 19 November 2014 at 12:15 CET (UTC+1).

The teams were seeded according to their results in the qualifying round. Germany, France and Spain, which received byes to the elite round, were automatically seeded into Pot A. Each group contained one team from Pot A, one team from Pot B, one team from Pot C, and one team from Pot D. Teams from the same qualifying round group could not be drawn in the same group.

Groups
Times up to 28 March 2015 were CET (UTC+1), thereafter times were CEST (UTC+2).

Group 1

Group 2

Group 3

Group 4

Group 5

Group 6

Ranking of second-placed teams
To determine the best second-placed team from the elite round which qualified for the final tournament, only the results of the second-placed teams against the first and third-placed teams in their group were taken into account.

Qualified teams
The following eight teams qualified for the final tournament.

1 Bold indicates champion for that year. Italic indicates host for that year.

Top goalscorers
The following players scored four goals or more in the qualifying competition.

10 goals
 Signe Bruun

9 goals
 Camille Surdez

7 goals
 Georgia Stanway

6 goals
 Viktoria Pinther

5 goals

 Aino Kröger
 Emilia Ukkonen
 Annamaria Serturini
 Kader Hançar

4 goals

 Celien Guns
 Michela Dubcová
 Chloe Kelly
 Jutta Rantala
 Janina Minge
 Stefanie Sanders
 Fenna Kalma
 Klaudia Miłek

References

External links

Qualification
2015
2014 in women's association football
2015 in women's association football
2015 in youth sport